The 1937 Western State Teachers Hilltoppers football team represented Western State Teachers College (later renamed Western Michigan University) as an independent during the 1937 college football season.  In their ninth season under head coach Mike Gary, the Broncos compiled a 5–3 record and outscored their opponents, 92 to 65.  Quarterback George Bond was the team captain.

Schedule

References

Western State Teachers
Western Michigan Broncos football seasons
Western State Teachers Hilltoppers football